In Kiribati mythology (specifically: Kiribati), Kai-n-Tiku-Aba ("tree of many branches") is a sacred tree located in Samoa, which grew on the back of a man named Na Abitu.  Koura-Abi, a destructive man, broke it.  Sorrowful, the people of Samoa scattered across the world.

Origins
This myth is from Kiribati, and explains why the I-Kiribati migrated to Kiribati from Samoa.

See also
 Kiribati

References

Kiribati mythology
Trees in mythology